Vallonia perspectiva or thin-lip vallonia is a species of small, air-breathing land snail, a terrestrial pulmonate gastropod mollusk in the family Valloniidae.

Description

Distribution
It is native to the United States and Canada.

See also
List of non-marine molluscs of Montana

References

External links
Global Names Index entry
EOL entry
DNR Wisconsin entry
ADW entry
shell detail
Vallonidae species

Valloniidae
Gastropods described in 1893